William Wallace Blair (October 11, 1828 – April 18, 1896) was an apostle and a member of the First Presidency of the Reorganized Church of Jesus Christ of Latter Day Saints (RLDS Church).

Blair was born in Holley, New York. In 1839, his family moved to LaSalle County, Illinois. In 1851, Blair encountered missionaries from the Latter Day Saint movement. On October 8, 1851, Blair was baptized by William Smith, the younger brother of Joseph Smith, the founder of the Latter Day Saint movement.

In 1852, Blair became somewhat disenchanted with William Smith and some of his associates when he "learned that some of the leading elders were walking in unrighteousness". Blair investigated and temporarily aligned himself with Charles B. Thompson's Baneemyites, but ultimately decided that it "was not the work of God."

In 1855, Blair aligned himself with John E. Page and Hazen Aldrich, who were claiming to have reorganized the true Church of Christ. However, in late 1856, Blair aligned himself with Latter Day Saints, including William Marks, Jason W. Briggs, and Zenas H. Gurley, who were teaching that a "reorganization" of Joseph Smith's church needed to be effected under Smith's son Joseph Smith III. On April 7, 1857, Blair was re-baptized into this "reorganization" by Gurley. The following day, he was ordained as a high priest and on October 7, 1858 at a church conference in Zarahemla, Wisconsin, Blair was ordained an apostle of the reorganization and he became a member of the Council of Twelve Apostles.

On October 8, 1860, shortly after the RLDS Church was formally organized, Blair was assigned as a missionary to Nauvoo, Illinois, Far West, Missouri, and Council Bluffs, Iowa. Blair was a successful missionary and baptized many individuals into the RLDS Church.

On April 10, 1873, Blair was chosen by prophet–president Joseph Smith III to be his first counselor in the First Presidency. He served in this capacity until his sudden death while traveling home to Lamoni, Iowa from a church conference in Kirtland, Ohio.

Blair was married to Elizabeth J. Doty and was the father of seven children.

Publications
W.W. Blair (1877). Joseph the Seer (Lamoni, Iowa: Herald Publishing House)
—— (Frederick B. Blair ed.) (1908).  (Lamoni, Iowa: Herald Publishing House)

Notes

References
 Roger D. Lanius, "W.W. Blair Contributed Much to Reorganization", Restoration Trail Forum vol. 4, no. 2, pp. 1–6
 "William Wallace Blair", History of the Reorganized Church of Jesus Christ of Latter Day Saints, 3:726–731
W.W. Blair (Frederick B. Blair ed.) (1908).  (Lamoni, Iowa: Herald Publishing House)

1828 births
1896 deaths
American Latter Day Saint missionaries
American Latter Day Saint writers
American leaders of the Community of Christ
Apostles of the Community of Christ
Community of Christ missionaries
Converts to Mormonism
Doctrine and Covenants people
Latter Day Saint missionaries in the United States
Members of the First Presidency (Community of Christ)
People from LaSalle County, Illinois
People from Lamoni, Iowa
People from Murray, New York
Religious leaders from New York (state)